Arthropitys is an extinct genus of calamitacean equisetale. The petrified fossils of Arthropitys bistriata, the type species, can be found at Chemnitz petrified forest, Chemnitz, Germany.

History
Petrified trunks of tree ferns, seed ferns, conifers as well as Cordaitales and different species of Calamites. 
The primeval plants were repeatedly discovered from the 17 century ongoing till today and mostly at Hilbersdorf, today a district of Chemnitz. In the mid-18th century, gemstone prospector David Frenzel (1691-1772) found numerous examples of this wood in the hills in and around Chemnitz.  One of his 1751 finds is one of the few petrified wood specimens still possessing its roots. Later a collector, the Hilbersdorf contractor Güldner, bequeathed some of the petrified logs to King Albert Museum in Chemnitz. The first director of the Museum, Johann Traugott Sterzel, took over the investigation of the findings. The Sterzeleanum in the museum (the petrified forest display) is dedicated to him.

References

Equisetales
Fossil taxa described in 1884
Permian plants